Benjamin Bowmar Curtis (born November 2, 1980) is an American actor who became known as the Dell Dude in a series of commercials for Dell Computers between 2000 and 2003. Since then, he has acted on stage and on screen.

Early life and education
Curtis, born in Chattanooga, Tennessee, is the second of two children; he attended and graduated from The McCallie School, an all-boys school in Chattanooga, after completing elementary school at Saint Nicholas School, also in Chattanooga.

At the age of thirteen, inspired by illusionist David Copperfield, Curtis started his own magic business; he competed in and won a few national stage contests. He attended Tannen's Magic School in New York City. He then attended New York University Tisch School of the Arts on an acting scholarship. He also studied at Lee Strasberg Theatre and Film Institute, the Atlantic Theater Company, and Tisch's Experimental Theater Wing.

Career

Dell commercials 
As part of a commercial advertising campaign, Curtis portrayed the character Steven. The casting call asked for a boy 12 to 17 years old; Curtis was 20. This advertising campaign popularized the phrase "Dude, you're getting a Dell". The commercials would usually feature Steven informing prospective buyers of all the perks of owning a Dell. When the party was sold on the idea, he would close with the catchphrase "Dude, you're getting a Dell." The campaign was a success and brought prominence to Dell and Curtis.

Curtis' tenure with Dell ended shortly after he was arrested and accused of buying a bag of marijuana in 2003. Dell terminated the role and according to Curtis, he was blacklisted from the entertainment community, and it was difficult for him to find work.

Later career 
In 2005, Curtis played the role of Christian in the Off-Broadway comedy Joy by John Fisher. The show ran at the Actors' Playhouse in Manhattan's West Village from August 14 to September 25.

In 2006, Curtis starred in the short film Raccoon opposite Jonathan Togo.

Curtis appeared in Take Me Out at NYU's Abe Burrows Theatre, and in Alexander Klymko's 2011 film Spy.

Curtis has made various appearances in What Would You Do?.

Curtis returned to Dell in internal training for Dell Technologies employees in 2022 to ask a question during Q&A for Dell leadership pertaining to Dell’s marketing strategy.

Filmography

Film

Television

Video games

References

External links
 Official Web site
 

1980 births
American male television actors
American male video game actors
Lee Strasberg Theatre and Film Institute alumni
Living people
Male actors from Tennessee
People from Chattanooga, Tennessee
Tisch School of the Arts alumni